George Williams (born 31 October 1994) is an English professional rugby league footballer who plays as a  and  for Warrington Wolves in the Super League and England at international level.

He spent two years in the NRL playing for the Canberra Raiders, however he was released during the 2021 NRL season on compassionate grounds.

Background
Williams was born in Wigan, Greater Manchester, England.

Club career

Wigan Warriors
Williams was born on 31 October 1994 in Wigan, Greater Manchester, and began playing junior rugby league at local amateur teams Ince Rose Bridge and Wigan St Patricks. He joined the Wigan scholarship programme and was signed to their Academy team in 2011 on a four-year contract.

Williams made his senior début in the fourth round of the Challenge Cup in April 2013, scoring a try in a 60–10 victory over Championship club Leigh. He made his first Super League appearance a month later against London Broncos, scoring another try, and also played against Widnes. He returned to the Academy side later in the season, helping Wigan win the under-19 Grand Final with two tries in a 34–10 victory against Leeds.

Williams became a regular in the first team during the 2014 season, and signed a new four-year contract in May 2014. He made 23 appearances during the season, scoring seven tries, including his first senior hat-trick against Hull F.C. in July 2014. He appeared for Wigan as a substitute in the 2014 Super League Grand Final defeat by St. Helens.

Following the departure of Blake Green, Williams became the first-choice  for Wigan and was assigned the number 6 jersey before the start of the 2015 season. He played in the World Club Series against Brisbane. Williams made 33 appearances and was a near ever-present throughout the season, missing only one game early in the year against Huddersfield after suffering an injury during the warm-up.

Williams was awarded the Super League Young Player of the Year award at the Man of Steel awards on 5 October 2015. Williams also played in the 2015 Grand Final, but was again on the losing side as Wigan were defeated 20–22 against the Leeds at Old Trafford.

He was awarded the Super League Young Player of the Year award in 2015, and helped the team win the 2016 Super League Grand Final, and the 2017 World Club Challenge.

In 2016, Williams again featured in the World Club Series against Brisbane, scoring one try in a heavy 12–42 defeat. Williams also won his first club honours, with Wigan defeating the Warrington club in the 2016 Grand Final at Old Trafford.

On 19 February 2017, Williams was the stand-out performer in the 2017 World Club Challenge against National Rugby League Premiers Cronulla-Sutherland Sharks, helping Wigan to a 22–6 win. In April 2017, he signed a new four-year contract with Wigan.

On 26 August 2017, Williams played in his first Challenge Cup final, with Wigan losing 14–18 to Hull F.C. at Wembley Stadium.

He played in the 2018 Super League Grand Final victory over Warrington at Old Trafford.

Canberra Raiders
On 9 July 2019 it was announced that Williams would leave Wigan to join the Canberra Raiders for the 2020 National Rugby League season.

Williams played 22 games for Canberra in the 2020 NRL season as the club fell one game short of the grand final.

On 25 May 2021, Williams was released from his contract with Canberra citing homesickness as the key reason.  It was initially reported that Williams had demanded an immediate release from the club until the player took to Twitter explaining his side of the story.  Williams said "I asked for a release weeks ago for the end of the season... Not once did I ask for a immediate release but instead of supporting me the club kicked me out the door".

On 22 June 2021, Williams fired one final parting shot at Canberra head coach Ricky Stuart saying  “I'm just sad that relationship is pretty sour, I’ve not spoken to him since the release. He was brilliant and I’ll never forget that, but when things went bad he turned his back on me".

Warrington Wolves
On 8 July 2021, it was reported that he had signed for Warrington in the Super League.  He made his Warrington debut against Leeds on 1 August 2021, scoring a last minute drop-goal in a 27-26 victory.  He was awarded Heritage Number 1174 for Warrington.

In round 24 of the 2021 Super League season, he kicked two drop goals including the winner in golden point extra-time as Warrington beat Salford 20-19.

International career 

Williams made his international début for England in 2015, and represented England at the 2017 World Cup.

After an outstanding Super League 2015 season, Williams was selected in the England team for their test series against New Zealand. Williams made his début for England in a test match, before the series, against France which saw Williams score a try in England's rout of their opponents.

In October 2016, Williams was selected in the England squad for the 2016 Four Nations.

In October 2017 he was selected in the England squad for the 2017 Rugby League World Cup, making two appearances for England in the group stages.

He was selected in England's 9s squad for the 2019 Rugby League World Cup 9s.

He was selected in squad for the 2019 Great Britain Lions tour of the Southern Hemisphere.

In October he was named in the England squad for the 2021 Rugby League World Cup.

In November he was named in the 2021 RLWC Team of the Tournament.

Career statistics

Honours

Club
 Super League
 Winners (2): 2016, 2018
 World Club Challenge
 Winners (1): 2017

Individual
 Super League Young Player of the Year: 2015

References

External links
Canberra Raiders profile
Wigan Warriors profile
SL profile
2017 RLWC profile
England profile

1994 births
Living people
Canberra Raiders players
England national rugby league team players
English rugby league players
Great Britain national rugby league team players
Rugby league five-eighths
Rugby league players from Wigan
South Wales Scorpions players
Warrington Wolves players
Wigan St Patricks players
Wigan Warriors players